Mongsen Ao is a member of the Ao languages, a branch of the Sino-Tibetan languages, predominantly spoken in central Mokokchung district of Nagaland, northeast India. Its speakers see the language as one of two varieties of a greater "Ao language," along with the prestige variety Chungli Ao.

A chapter in the anthropological monograph of Mills (1926) provides a grammatical sketch of the variety of Mongsen Ao spoken in Longjang village. Coupe (2003) is one of the few acoustic studies published on a Kuki-Chin-Naga language (only three exist). Coupe (2007) is a reference grammar of the language, based on a revision of his PhD dissertation (Coupe 2004).

Alphabet
The Ao alphabet is based on the Latin script and was developed in the 1880s by the Christian missionary Edward W. Clark for Chungli Ao. The system is not based on phonemic principles and does not represent tone. A Christian Bible was published using the orthography in 1964. Coupe (2003) suggests a more consistent alphabet for Mongsen Ao.

A, B, Ch, E, I, J, K, L, M, N, Ng, O, P, R, S, T, U, Y, Z

Phonology
This section describes the sound system of Mongsen Ao as spoken in Mangmetong village and is based on Coupe (2007).

Vowels
Mongsen Ao has 6 vowels:

 The high central  is rounded.
 The two low vowels  differ in terms of phonation type.  has modal voice (i.e. normal phonation);  has creaky voice (also known as vocal fry, laryngealization). Coupe (2003) argues that this is a separate vowel phoneme and not a tone, a glottal stop, or resulting from prosodic effects.

Consonants
Mongsen Ao has 27 consonants:

 Dental consonants  are laminal denti-alveolar.
 The post-alveolar approximant  varies from an apical post-alveolar to subapical retroflex: .
 The glottal stop  occurs only at the end of words. However, in this position it contrasts with words ending in vowels:  'spear' vs.  'person'. Thus, the glottal stop has a somewhat marginal phonemic status.

Tone
Ao is a tonal language with 3 contrasting lexical tones:
 high
 mid
 low

All are register tones.

Syllable and phonotactics
The generalized syllable structure of Ao is abbreviated as the following:

 (C1)V(G)(C2)+T

(C1)

 Any of the 20 consonants may appear as an optional syllable onset (excluding the word-final ).

V

 All 6 vowels may occur as the syllable nucleus.

(G)

 The optional glide elements following the head vowel are essentially non-syllabic offglide realizations of the 4 vowels . For example,  →  'species of centipede'.
 The following are the possible tautsyllabic combinations: .

(C2)

 The following consonants may occur in the optional syllable coda: unaspirated stops, nasals, and the rhotic . The glottal stop with its restricted distribution also occurs but only word-finally.

T

All syllables occur with one of the three tones. In a VG sequence, tone only occurs the vowel head.

Syntax
Ao is an SOV language with postpositions. Adjectives, numerals and demonstratives follow the nouns they modify, whilst relative clauses may be either externally or internally headed. Adverbial subordinators are suffixes attached to the verb and the end of the subordinate clause.

See also
 Ao Naga

References

Bibliography
 Clark, E. W. (1981). The Ao-Naga Grammar with Illustrations, Phrases, and Vocabulary. Delhi: Gian Publications, Mittal Publishers Distributors. (Original work published 1893).
 Coupe, Alexander R. (2003). A Phonetic and Phonological Description of Ao: A Tibeto-Burman Language of Nagaland, North-east India. Pacific Linguistics (No. 543). Canberra: Pacific Linguistics, Research School of Pacific and Asian Studies, The Australian National University. .
 Coupe, Alexander R. 2004. The Mongsen Dialect of Ao: a language of Nagaland. Unpublished PhD dissertation, La Trobe University.
 Coupe, Alexander R. (2007). A grammar of Mongsen Ao [Mouton Grammar Library 39]. Berlin & New York: Mouton de Gruyter. .
 Escamilla, R. M. (2012). An Updated Typology of Causative Constructions: Form-Function Mappings in Hupa (California Athabaskan), Chungli Ao (Tibeto-Burman), and Beyond. Unpublished PhD dissertation, U.C. Berkeley.
 Gowda, K. S. Gurubasave. (1972). Ao-Naga Phonetic Reader. CIIL Phonetic Reader Series (No. 7). Mysore: Central Institute of Indian Languages.
 Gowda, K. S. Gurubasave. (1975). Ao Grammar. Grammar series (No. 1). Mysore: Central Institute of Indian Languages.
 Mills, J. P (1926). The Ao Nagas. London: MacMillan & Co.

External links

Ao Naga Tribe
Ao
Bible Translation in Ao Naga (Language in India)
Narrating an Ao Naga Folktale (Language in India)

Ao languages
Languages of Nagaland